The Adamawa Emirate (Fula: Lamorde Adamaawa 𞤤𞤢𞤥𞤮𞤪𞤣𞤫 𞤢𞤣𞤢𞤥𞤢𞥄𞤱𞤢; ;) is a traditional state located in Fombina, an area which now roughly corresponds to areas of Adamawa State and Taraba state in Nigeria, and previously also in the three northern provinces of Cameroon (Far North, North, and Adamawa), including minor Parts of Chad and the Central African Republic. It was founded by Modibo Adama, a commander of Sheikh Usman dan Fodio, the man who began the Fulani jihad in 1809. The capital was moved several times until it settled in Yola, Nigeria on the banks of the Benue River in Nigeria around 1841. At the time of Adama's death his realm encompassed parts of modern Nigeria and much of north Cameroon. It was technically part of the Sokoto Caliphate, and it had to pay a tribute to the leaders in Sokoto.

Early history
The Fula first settled in the area in the 14th century. The nineteenth century Adamawa emirate lay south of Lake Chad, and east of Hausaland, within latitudes 6° and 11° North, and longitudes 10° and 14° East. The external limits are hard to fix in exact terms, because it is difficult to distinguish between people who the Fulani subjected to their rule, and those whom they simply raided for slaves, without establishing any form of administrative links. According to some estimates, by the late 19th century, slaves constituted about 50% of the population of the Fulɓe-ruled Adamawa Emirate, where they were referred to as jeyaɓe (singular jeyado). Based on the region subjected to Fulani rule, the emirate stretched from areas south of the Adamawa plateau near Tibati, in the South, to the Diamare, in the north, from the slopes of the Bamenda-Adamawa-Mandara Highlands in the west, to Baya, Laka, Mundang and Musgum country in the east. Early British administrators reporting from Yola, put the surface area of Adamawa at between 35,000 and 40,000 square miles or between 90,650 and 103,600 square kilometers. As a result of European treaties in 1893 and 1894, parts of the Emirate can today be found in Chad, the Central African Republic, Nigeria and Cameroon, which retained about three-quarter of the total area of the Emirate.

The southern regions of the emirate is characterized by thin forest of broad leaved savannah woodland or orchard vegetation type. The country becomes more and more of open grasslands towards the north. The vegetation was a strong inducement to Fulani settlement in Adamawa, and during the jihad, it offered no serious obstacle to the extension of military power based on cavalry.

The earliest Fulbe migrations into Adamawa was from Bornu country, but attempts by Kurt Strümpell, the German colonial administrator at Garoua (1906-1910), to reconstruct routes of migration from oral tradition, reveals that many Fulani entered Adamawa, through Hausaland, as well as the Benue valley. These migrations moved in groups belonging to the same clans or sub-ethnic groups, and the numbers varied considerably, depending on the motives for migration. Some moved for only short distances, while others did so, over very long distances within a few generations. The principal Fulani clans, that entered Adamawa, were the Mbewe or Beweji, Ngara'en or FeroBe, WollarBe, Yillaga, Ba'en, and Kiri'en. Each subgroup claims to have their own peculiar characteristics, but common to all Fulani, are their distinct physical features: fair skin color, aquiline noses, thin lips, straight hair, and their language Fulfulde, which marks them off from the mass of the Sudanic people around them.

Rulers

Rulers of the Adamawa Emirate, who took the title "Baban-Lamido":

References

Passarge, Adamaua, (Berlin, 1895)
Adamawa. Encyclopædia Britannica Online.  August 28, 2005.

Former countries in Africa
Sokoto Caliphate
Countries in precolonial Africa
Nigerian traditional states
History of Cameroon
Emirates
1809 establishments in Africa